Fusinus is a genus of small to large sea snails, marine gastropod mollusks in the family Fasciolariidae, the spindle snails and tulip snails.

Fossil records
This genus is known in the fossil records from the Cretaceous to the Quaternary (age range: from 94.3 to 0.0 million years ago). Fossils are found in the marine strata all over the world.

Species
Species in the genus Fusinus include:

According to the World Register of Marine Species (WoRMS) the following species with accepted names are included within the genus Fusinus 

 Fusinus aepynotus (Dall, 1889) - graceful spindle
 Fusinus africanae (Barnard, 1959)
 Fusinus agadirensis Hadorn & Rolàn, 1999
 Fusinus agatha (Simone & Abbate, 2005) 
 Fusinus albacarinoides Hadorn, Afonso & Rolán, 2009
 Fusinus albinus (Adams, 1856)
 Fusinus alcimus (Dall, 1889) - stout spindle
 Fusinus alcyoneum Hadorn & Fraussen, 2006
 Fusinus allyni McLean, 1970
 Fusinus alternatus Buzzurro & Russo, 2007
 Fusinus amadeus Callomon & Snyder, 2008
 Fusinus amphiurgus (Dall, 1889) - slender spindle
 Fusinus annae Snyder, 1986
 Fusinus arabicus (Melvill, 1898)
 Fusinus articulatus (G.B. Sowerby II, 1880)
 Fusinus assimilis (Adams, 1856)
 Fusinus aurinodatus Stahlschmidt & Lyons, 2009
 Fusinus australis (Quoy & Gaimard, 1833)
 Fusinus barclayi (G.B. Sowerby III, 1894)
 † Fusinus bensoni R. S. Allan, 1926 
 Fusinus benthalis (Dall, 1889) - modest spindle
 Fusinus bifrons (Sturany, 1900)
 Fusinus blakensis Hadorn & Rogers, 2000
 Fusinus bocagei (P. Fischer, 1882)
 Fusinus bocagei marcelpini Hadorn & Ryall, 1999
 Fusinus boettgeri (von Maltzan, 1884)
 Fusinus boucheti Hadorn & Ryall, 1999
 Fusinus brianoi Bozzetti, 2006
 Fusinus buzzurroi Prkic & Russo, 2008
 Fusinus chocolatus (Okutani, 1983)
 Fusinus chuni (Martens, 1904)
 Fusinus clarae Russo & Renda in Russo, 2013
  † Fusinus clavilithoides Landau, Harzhauser, Büyükmeriç & Breitenberger, 2016
 Fusinus colombiensis M. A. Snyder & N. C. Snyder, 1999
 Fusinus columbiensis M.A. Snyder & N.C. Snyder, 1999
 Fusinus colus (Linnaeus, 1758)
 Fusinus consetti (Iredale, 1929)
 Fusinus corallinus Russo & Germanà, 2014
 Fusinus crassiplicatus Kira, 1954
 Fusinus cratis Kilburn, 1973
 Fusinus cretellai Buzzurro & Russo, 2008
 Fusinus damasoi Petuch & Berschauer, 2016
 Fusinus diandraensis Goodwin & Kosuge, 2008
 Fusinus dilectus (Adams, 1856)
 Fusinus dimassai Buzzurro & Russo, 2007
 Fusinus diminutus Dall, 1915
 Fusinus dimitrii Buzzurro & Ovalis in Buzzurro & Russo, 2007
 Fusinus dovpeledi Snyder, 2002
 Fusinus emmae Callomon & Snyder, 2010
 Fusinus euekes Callomon & Snyder, 2017
 Fusinus ferrugineus (Kuroda & Habe, 1960)
 Fusinus fioritae Russo & Pagli, 2019
 Fusinus flammulatus Lussi & Stahlschmidt, 2007
 Fusinus flavicomus Hadorn & Fraussen, 2006
 Fusinus forceps (Perry, 1811)
 Fusinus forceps salisburyi Fulton, 1930
 Fusinus frausseni Thach, 2018
 Fusinus gallagheri Smythe & Chatfield, 1981
 Fusinus gemmulifer Kira, 1959
 Fusinus gracillimus (Adams & Reeve, 1848)
 Fusinus guidonis Delsaerdt, 1995
 Fusinus halistreptus (Dall, 1889)
 Fusinus hartvigii (Shuttleworth, 1856)
 Fusinus harveyi Hadorn & Roger, 2000
 Fusinus hayesi Snyder, 1996
 Fusinus hernandezi Hadorn & Rolán, 2009
 Fusinus humboldti Poorman, 1981
 Fusinus inglorius Hadorn & Fraussen, 2006
 Fusinus insularis Russo & Calascibetta, 2018
 Fusinus jasminae Hadorn, 1966
 Fusinus juliabrownae Callomon, Snyder & Noseworthy, 2009
 Fusinus labronicus (Monterosato, 1884)
 Fusinus laetus (G.B. Sowerby II, 1880)
 Fusinus laticlavius Callomon & Snyder, 2017
 Fusinus laviniae Snyder & Hadorn, 2006
 Fusinus lightbourni M.A. Snyder, 1984
 Fusinus longissimus (Gmelin, 1791)
 Fusinus magnapex Poorman, 1981
 Fusinus malhaensis Hadorn, Fraussen & Bondarev, 2001
 Fusinus marcusi Hadorn & Rogers, 2000
 Fusinus mariaodetae Petuch & Berschauer, 2016
 Fusinus marisinicus Callomon & Snyder, 2009
 Fusinus maritzaallaryae Cossignani & Allary, 2019
 Fusinus maroccensis (Gmelin, 1791)
 † Fusinus menengtenganus (K. Martin, 1895) 
 Fusinus meteoris Gofas, 2000
 Fusinus midwayensis Kosuge, 1979
 Fusinus multicarinatus (Lamarck, 1822)
 Fusinus nobilis Reeve, 1847
 Fusinus nodosoplicatus (Dunker, 1867)
 Fusinus palmarium Hadorn & Fraussen, 2006
 Fusinus parvulus (Monterosato, 1884)
 Fusinus pauciliratus (Shuto, 1962)
 Fusinus pauciliratus complex Snyder, 2000
 Fusinus paulus Poorman, 1981
 Fusinus penioniformis Habe, 1970
 Fusinus percyanus (G. B. Sowerby II, 1880)
 Fusinus perplexus (Adams, 1864)
 Fusinus pulchellus (Philippi, 1844)
 Fusinus raricostatus (Del Prete, 1883)
 Fusinus rogersi Hadorn, 1999
 Fusinus rudis (Philippi, 1844)
 Fusinus rudis var. parvulus Monterosato, 1884
 Fusinus rushii (Dall, 1889)
 Fusinus rusticulus (Monterosato, 1880)
 Fusinus salisburyi Fulton, 1930
 Fusinus sandvichensis (G. B. Sowerby II, 1880)
 Fusinus saundersi Hadorn & Rolán, 2009
 Fusinus schrammi (Crosse, 1865)
 † Fusinus sculptilis (Tate, 1888) 
 Fusinus sectus (Locard, 1897)
 Fusinus seriatus Callomon & Snyder, 2017
 Fusinus severnsi Goodwin & Kosuge, 2008
 Fusinus somaliensis Smythe & Chatfield, 1984
 Fusinus sonorae Poorman, 1981
 Fusinus stannum Callomon & Snyder, 2008
 Fusinus stanyi Swinnen & Fraussen, 2006
 † Fusinus tangituensis (Marwick, 1926) 
 Fusinus tenerifensis Hadorn & Rolán, 1999
 Fusinus teretron Callomon & Snyder, 2008
 Fusinus thermariensis Hadorn & Fraussen, 2006
 Fusinus thielei (Schepman, 1911)
 Fusinus thompsoni Hadorn & Rogers, 2000
 Fusinus toreuma (Deshayes, 1843)
 Fusinus townsendi (Melvill, 1899)
 Fusinus transkeiensis Hadorn, 2000
 Fusinus ventimigliae Russo & Renda in Russo, 2013
 Fusinus vitreus Dall, 1927
 † Fusinus waihaoicus Laws, 1935 
 Fusinus wallacei Hadorn & Fraussen, 2006
 Fusinus zacae Strong & Hertlein, 1937
 Fusinus zebrinus (Odhner, 1923)

Species brought into synonymy
 Subgenus Fusinus (Barbarofusus) Grabau & Shimer, 1909 accepted as Fusinus Rafinesque, 1815
 Subgenus Fusinus (Chryseofusus) Hadorn & Fraussen, 2003 accepted as Chryseofusus Hadorn & Fraussen, 2003
 Subgenus Fusinus (Sinistralia) H. Adams & A. Adams, 1853 accepted as Fusinus Rafinesque, 1815
 Fusinus acherusius Hadorn & Fraussen, 2003 : synonym of Chryseofusus acherusius (Hadorn & Fraussen, 2003)
 Fusinus akitai Kuroda & Habe, 1961: synonym of Marmorofusus akitai (Kuroda & Habe, 1961) (original combination)
 Fusinus alisae Hdorn & Fraussen, 2003 : synonym of Chryseofusus alisae
 Fusinus alisonae Hadorn, Snyder & Fraussen, 2008: synonym of Chryseofusus alisonae (Hadorn, Snyder & Fraussen, 2008)
 Fusinus ambustus (Gould, 1853): synonym of Hesperaptyxis ambustus (Gould, 1853)
 Fusinus amiantus :synonym of  Amiantofusus amiantus
 Fusinus angeli Russo & Angelidis, 2016 : synonym of Aegeofusinus angeli (Russo & Angelidis, 2016) (original combination)
 Fusinus anguliplicatus Kuroda, 1949: synonym of Fusinus teretron Callomon & Snyder, 2008
 Fusinus ansatus (Gmelin, 1791): synonym of Lyonsifusus ansatus (Gmelin, 1791)
 Fusinus artutus Hadorn & Fraussen, 2003 : synonym of  Chryseofusus artutus
 Fusinus barbarensis (Trask, 1855) - Santa Barbara spindle: synonym of Barbarofusus barbarensis (Trask, 1855) †
 Fusinus beckii (Reeve, 1848): synonym of Enigmofusus beckii (Reeve, 1848)
 Fusinus benjamini Hadorn & Rolàn, 1997: synonym of Aristofusus benjamini (Hadorn, 1997) (original combination)
 Fusinus bishopi Petuch & Berschauer, 2017: synonym of Marmorofusus bishopi (Petuch & Berschauer, 2017) (original combination)
 Fusinus bonaespei (Barnard, 1959): synonym of Chryseofusus bonaespei (Barnard, 1959)
 Fusinus bountyi Rehder & Wilson, 1975: synonym of Cyrtulus bountyi (Rehder & B. R. Wilson, 1975) (original combination)
 Fusinus bradneri (Drivas & Jay, 1990) : synonym of Chryseofusus bradneri
 Fusinus braziliensis (Grabau, 1904): synonym of Goniofusus brasiliensis (Grabau, 1904)
 Fusinus breviplicatus Kuroda, 1948: synonym of Fusinus teretron Callomon & Snyder, 2008
 Fusinus buxeus (Reeve, 1847); synonym of Viridifusus buxeus (Reeve, 1847)
 Fusinus cadus Hadorn & Fraussen, 2003 : synonym of  Chryseofusus cadus
 Fusinus caparti Adam & Knudsen, 1950: synonym of Apertifusus caparti (Adam & Knudsen, 1955)
 Fusinus carvalhoriosi Mascotay & Campos, 2001: synonym of Lyonsifusus carvalhoriosi (Macsotay & Campos, 2001)
 Fusinus ceramidus (Dall, 1889): synonym of Lamellilatirus ceramidus (Dall, 1889)
 Fusinus chrysodomoides (Schepman, 1911) : synonym of Chryseofusus chrysodomoides
 Fusinus cinereus (Reeve, 1847): synonym of Hesperaptyxis cinereus  (Reeve, 1847)
 Fusinus colpoicus (Dall, 1909): synonym of Araiofusus colpoicus (Dall, 1915) 
 Fusinus coltrorum Hadorn & Rogers, 2000: synonym of Heilprinia coltrorum (Hadorn & Rogers, 2000)
 Fusinus couei (Petit de la Saussaye, 1853) - Yucatan spindle: synonym of Aristofusus couei (Petit de la Saussaye, 1853)
 Fusinus dampieri Finlay, 1930: synonym of Marmorofusus philippii (Jonas, 1846)
 Fusinus dapsilis Hadorn & Fraussen, 2003 : synonym of Chryseofusus dapsilis
 Fusinus dowianus Olsson, 1954: synonym of Heilprinia dowiana (Olsson, 1954) (original combination)
 Fusinus dupetitthouarsi (Kiener, 1840): synonym of Goniofusus dupetitthouarsi (Kiener, 1840)
 Fusinus edjanssi Callomon & Snyder, 2017: synonym of Callifusus edjanssi (Callomon & Snyder, 2017)
 Fusinus eucosmius (Dall, 1889) - apricot spindle : synonym of Fusinus excavatus (Sowerby II, 1880)
 Fusinus eviae Buzzurro & Russo, 2007: synonym of Aegeofusinus eviae (Buzzurro & Russo, 2007) (original combination)
 Fusinus excavatus (Sowerby II, 1880): synonym of Aristofusus excavatus (G. B. Sowerby II, 1880) (original combination)
 Fusinus faurei (Barnard, 1959): synonym of Granulifusus faurei (Barnard, 1959)
 Fusinus felipensis (Lowe, 1935): synonym of Hesperaptyxis felipensis (H. N. Lowe, 1935) (original combination)
 Fusinus filosus (Schubert & Wagner, 1829): synonym of Polygona filosa (Schubert & J. A. Wagner, 1829)
 Fusinus frailensis Mascotay & Campos, 2001: synonym of Lyonsifusus ansatus (Gmelin, 1791)
 Fusinus fredbakeri Lowe, 1935: synonym of Hesperaptyxis fredbakeri (H. N. Lowe, 1935) (original combination)
 Fusinus frenguellii (Carcelles, 1953): synonym of Apertifusus frenguellii (Carcelles, 1953)
 Fusinus galatheae Powell, 1967: synonym of Cyrtulus galatheae (Powell, 1967) (original combination)
 Fusinus galatheae bountyi Rehder & Wilson, 1975: synonym of Cyrtulus bountyi (Rehder & B. R. Wilson, 1975)
 Fusinus genticus]' (Iredale, 1936): synonym of Cyrtulus genticus (Iredale, 1936)
 Fusinus harfordii (Stearns, 1871): synonym of Harfordia harfordii (Stearns, 1871)
 Fusinus helenae Bartsch, 1939 - brown spindle: synonym of Aristofusus helenae (Bartsch, 1939) (original combination)
 Fusinus hyphalus M. Smith, 1940 : synonym of  Chryseofusus hyphalus Fusinus grabaui Kuroda & Habe, 1952 : synonym of  Fusinus nodosoplicatus Fusinus graciliformis (G.B. Sowerby II, 1880) : synonym of  Chryseofusus graciliformis Fusinus indicus (Anton, 1838): synonym of Marmorofusus tuberculatus (Lamarck, 1822)
 Fusinus irregularis (Grabau, 1904): synonym of Callifusus irregularis (Grabau, 1904)
 Fusinus josei Hadorn & Rogers, 2000: synonym of Apertifusus josei (Hadorn & Rogers, 2000) (original combination)
 Fusinus jurgeni Hadorn & Fraussen, 2002 : synonym of Chryseofusus jurgeni Fusinus kazdailisi Fraussen & Hadorn, 2000 : synonym of  Chryseofusus kazdailisi Fusinus kilburni Hadorn, 1999: synonym of Cyrtulus kilburni (Hadorn, 1999) (original combination)
 Fusinus kobelti (Dall, 1877): synonym of Barbarofusus kobelti (Dall, 1877)
 Fusinus laticostatus (Deshayes, 1831): synonym of Marmorofusus undulatus (Gmelin, 1791)
 Fusinus leptorhynchus (Tapparone-Canefri, 1875): synonym of Marmorofusus leptorhynchus (Tapperoni Canefri, 1875)
 Fusinus luteopictus (Dall, 1877): synonym of Hesperaptyxis luteopictus (Dall, 1877)
 Fusinus margaritae Buzzurro & Russo, 2007: synonym of Aegeofusinus margaritae (Buzzurro & Russo, 2007)
 Fusinus martinezi Macsotay & Campos, 2001: synonym of Lyonsifusus ansatus (Gmelin, 1791)
 Fusinus mauiensis Callomon & Snyder, 2006: synonym of Cyrtulus mauiensis (Callomon & Snyder, 2006)
 Fusinus meyeri (Dunker, 1869): synonym of Apertifusus meyeri (Dunker, 1869)
 Fusinus michaelrogersi Goodwin, 2001: synonym of Marmorofusus michaelrogersi (Goodwin, 2001)
 Fusinus monksae Dall, 1915 : synonym of Fusinus robustus (Trask, 1855)
 Fusinus nicki Snyder, 2002: synonym of Enigmofusus nicki (Snyder, 2002)
 Fusinus nicobaricus (Röding, 1798): synonym of Marmorofusus nicobaricus (Röding, 1798)
 Fusinus nigrirostratus (E. A. Smith, 1879): synonym of Marmorofusus nigrirostratus (E. A. Smith, 1879)
 Fusinus novaehollandiae (Reeve, 1846): synonym of Propefusus novaehollandiae (Reeve, 1848)
 Fusinus oblitus (Reeve, 1847): synonym of Marmorofusus oblitus (Reeve, 1847) Fusinus ocelliferus (Lamarck, 1816): synonym of Africofusus ocelliferus (Lamarck, 1816)
 Fusinus panamensis Dall, 1908 : synonym of Fusinus spectrum Fusinus patriciae Russo & Olivieri in Russo, 2013: synonym of Aegeofusinus patriciae (Russo & Olivieri, 2013)
 Fusinus pearsoni Snyder, 2002 : synonym of Fusolatirus pearsoni (Snyder, 2002)
 Fusinus polygonoides (Lamarck, 1822): synonym of Marmorofusus polygonoides (Lamarck, 1822)
 Fusinus profetai Nofroni, 1982: synonym of Aegeofusinus profetai (Nofroni, 1982)
 Fusinus pyrulatus (Reeve, 1847): synonym of Propefusus undulatus (Perry, 1811)
 Fusinus retiarius (Martens, 1901): synonym of Vermeijius retiarius (E. von Martens, 1901)
 Fusinus riscus Hdorn & Fraussen, 2003 : synonym of  Chryseofusus riscus Fusinus robustus (Trask, 1855): synonym of Harfordia robusta (Trask, 1855)
 Fusinus rolani Buzzurro & Ovalis, 2005: synonym of Aegeofusinus rolani (Buzzurro & Ovalis, 2005)
 Fusinus rostratus (Olivi, 1792): synonym of Gracilipurpura rostrata (Olivi, 1792)
 Fusinus rutilus Nicolay & Berthelot, 1996: synonym of Ariefusus rutilus (Nicolay & Berthelot, 1996)
 Fusinus sanctaeluciae : redirected to Fusinus rostratus Fusinus satsumaensis Hadorn & Chino, 2005 : synonym of  Chryseofusus satsumaensis Fusinus scissus Hadorn & Fraussen, 2003 : synonym of Chryseofusus scissus Fusinus similis (Baird, 1873): synonym of Cyrtulus similis (Baird, 1873)
 Fusinus spectrum (A. Adams & Reeve, 1848): synonym of Goniofusus spectrum (A. Adams & Reeve, 1848)
 Fusinus stegeri Lyons, 1978 - ornamented spindle: synonym of Aristofusus stegeri (Lyons, 1978)
 Fusinus strigatus (Philippi, 1850): synonym of Goniofusus strigatus (Philippi, 1850)
 Fusinus subangulatus (von Martens, 1901) : synonym of Chryseofusus subangulatus Fusinus suturalis Nordsieck, 1972: synonym of Fusinus parvulus (Monterosato, 1884) 
 Fusinus syracusanus (Linnaeus, 1758): synonym of Aptyxis syracusana (Linnaeus, 1758)
 Fusinus syracusanus var. rissoianus Locard, 1892: synonym of Aptyxis syracusana (Linnaeus, 1758)
 Fusinus syracusanus var. rubra Scacchi, 1836: synonym of Aptyxis syracusana (Linnaeus, 1758)
 Fusinus syracusanus var. umbilicata Coen, 1922: synonym of Aptyxis syracusana (Linnaeus, 1758)
 Fusinus tessellatus (G.B. Sowerby II, 1880): synonym of Marmorofusus philippii (Jonas, 1846)
 Fusinus timessus (Dall, 1889): synonym of Heilprinia timessa (Dall, 1889)
 Fusinus toreuma: synonym of  Fusinus colus Fusinus tuberculatus (Lamarck, 1822): synonym of Marmorofusus tuberculatus (Lamarck, 1822)
 Fusinus tuberosus (Reeve, 1847): synonym of Marmorofusus tuberosus (Reeve, 1847)
 Fusinus turris (Valenciennes, 1832): synonym of Goniofusus turris (Valenciennes, 1832)
 Fusinus undatus (Gmelin, 1791): synonym of Cyrtulus undatus (Gmelin, 1791)
 Fusinus undulatus (Gmelin, 1791): synonym of Marmorofusus undulatus (Gmelin, 1791)
 Fusinus valdiviae Hadorn & Fraussen, 1999 : synonym of Chryseofusus graciliformis Fusinus verbinneni Snyder, 2006: synonym of Marmorofusus verbinneni (Snyder, 2006)
 Fusinus vercoi Snyder, 2004: synonym of Marmorofusus vercoi (Snyder, 2004)
 Fusinus verrucosus (Gmelin, 1791): synonym of Marmorofusus verrucosus (Gmelin, 1791)
 Fusinus virginiae Hadorn & Fraussen, 2002: synonym of Vermeijius virginiae (Hadorn & Fraussen, 2002)
 Fusinus wareni Hadorn & Fraussen, 2003 : synonym of  Chryseofusus scissus Fusinus wellsi Snyder, 2004: synonym of Marmorofusus wellsi (Snyder, 2004)
 Fusinus westralis Hadorn & Fraussen, 2003 : synonym of  Chryseofusus westralis Fusinus williami Poppe & Tagaro, 2006: synonym of Granulifusus williami (Poppe & Tagaro, 2006)

References

 Buzzurro G. & Russo P. (2007). Fusinus del Mediterraneo''. published by the authors

External links 
  Snyder, M.A. (2003) Catalogue of the marine gastropod family Fasciolariidae. Academy of Natural Sciences of Philadelphia, Special Publication, 21, iii + 1–431
 Photo

 
Fasciolariidae
Cenomanian genus first appearances
Extant Cenomanian first appearances
Taxa named by Constantine Samuel Rafinesque
Gastropod genera